Going Crooked is a 1926 American silent crime film produced and distributed by the Fox Film Corporation. It was directed by George Melford and stars Bessie Love.

The film is preserved at the Museum of Modern Art, the George Eastman House, and the Bibliothèque nationale de France.

Plot 
Mordaunt (von Seyffertitz) and his gang use Marie (Love) as an unwitting accomplice in the theft of the acclaimed Rajah diamond. During the heist, a man is killed, and innocent Rogers (Fenton) is later sentenced to death for the murder.

Marie works with District Attorney Banning (Shaw) to get Mordaunt to confess, just in time to save Rogers from the electric chair. Marie and Shaw are married.

Cast

Production 
For authenticity, some scenes were filmed on Ferguson Alley in Chinatown, Los Angeles.

Reception 

The film received positive reviews, with Love and von Seyffertitz receiving high acclaim for their performances.

References

External links 

 
 
 
 Lobby poster
 Portuguese language poster; "Por Mau Caminho" translates to "Astray"

1926 crime films
1920s heist films
1926 films
American black-and-white films
American crime films
American films based on plays
American heist films
American silent feature films
Films directed by George Melford
Fox Film films
Surviving American silent films
1920s American films